Rishabh Chouhan (born 5 September 1999) is an Indian cricketer. He made his Twenty20 debut for Madhya Pradesh in the 2018–19 Syed Mushtaq Ali Trophy on 24 February 2019. He made his List A debut on 30 September 2019, for Madhya Pradesh in the 2019–20 Vijay Hazare Trophy.

References

External links
 

1999 births
Living people
Indian cricketers
Madhya Pradesh cricketers
Place of birth missing (living people)